The Nadăș is a left tributary of the river Cigher in Romania. It flows into the Cigher near the village Nadăș.

Hydronymy
The name in Hungarian means "reedy". The Romanian name derives from that.

References

Rivers of Romania
Rivers of Arad County